The Mocking of Christ is an oil-on-canvas painting by the Flemish painter Anthony van Dyck (1599–1641).

It is held in the Princeton University Art Museum.

See also
 List of paintings by Anthony van Dyck
 The Mocking of Christ (Grünewald)
 Christ Mocked

References

External links
 

1630 paintings
Art in the Princeton University Art Museum
Religious paintings by Anthony van Dyck
Paintings depicting the Passion of Jesus
Paintings in New Jersey